Kennaway is a surname, and may refer to:

Adrienne Kennaway (born 1945), New Zealand illustrator and writer of children's picture books
Ernest Kennaway (1881–1958), British pathologist
Guy Kennaway, English writer
James Kennaway (1928–1968), Scottish novelist and screenwriter
Joe Kennaway (1905–1969), Canadian and Scottish football goalkeeper
Sir John Kennaway, 1st Baronet (1758–1836), British soldier and diplomat
Sir John Kennaway, 3rd Baronet (1837–1919), British politician
Walter Kennaway (1835–1920), New Zealand provincial politician and run-holder in Canterbury